The Piasecki PV-2 was a helicopter designed by Frank Piasecki.  The PV-2 is best known for being one of the first successful helicopters flown in the United States.  The PV-2 first flew on April 11, 1943.  Developed as a technology demonstrator, the PV-2 brought several new features such as the first dynamically balanced rotor blades, a rigid tail rotor with a tension-torsion pitch change system, and a full cyclic and collective rotor pitch control.

The PV-2 is now on display at the National Air and Space Museum's Steven F. Udvar-Hazy Center

Specifications

References

External links

 P-V Engineering Forum PV-2 at the National Air and Space Museum
 Popular Science August 1951, page 30 rare photo of PV-2 in flight

PV-02
1940s United States helicopters
Single-engined piston helicopters
Individual aircraft in the collection of the Smithsonian Institution
Aircraft first flown in 1943